Shahjalal Upashahor, Sylhet is a neighborhood in Sylhet, Bangladesh. It is part of Ward 22 of Sylhet City Corporation.

References

Sylhet